Tirora railway station serves Tirora city and surrounding villages in Gondia district in Maharashtra, India.

References

Railway stations in Bhandara district